Itin,  itín or ITIN may refer to
Individual Taxpayer Identification Number, a United States tax processing number
International Token Identification Number, a unique identifier of tokens build upon Blockchain technology
Ilya Itin (born 1967), Russian concert pianist
Vivian Itin (1894–1938), Russian writer
Itín, Chaco, a village and municipality in northern Argentina
 Prosopis kuntzei, a South American leguminous tree known as itín
Itin., abbreviation of itinerary or itinerarium